Lars-Göran Arwidson (born 4 April 1946) is a Swedish biathlete who competed at the 1968, 1972 and 1976 Winter Olympics.

At the 1968 Winter Olympics in Grenoble, he won a bronze medal in the 4×7.5 km relay, and finished 17th in the 20 km individual race. At the 1972 Winter Olympics in Sapporo, he won a bronze medal in the 20 km, and finished 5th in the relay.

He is the father of the Olympic biathlete Tobias Arwidson.

References

1946 births
Living people
People from Malung-Sälen Municipality
Swedish male biathletes
Olympic biathletes of Sweden
Biathletes at the 1968 Winter Olympics
Biathletes at the 1972 Winter Olympics
Biathletes at the 1976 Winter Olympics
Olympic bronze medalists for Sweden
Olympic medalists in biathlon
Medalists at the 1968 Winter Olympics
Medalists at the 1972 Winter Olympics
20th-century Swedish people